Antranokoaky is a rural municipality in western Madagascar. It belongs to the district of Morafenobe, which is a part of Melaky Region.

References and notes 

Populated places in Melaky